Qifu may refer to various royal family members of the Xianbei-led Chinese Western Qin dynasty.

Qifu Guoren (Chinese: 乞伏國仁; died 388), founding monarch
Qifu Gangui (Chinese: 乞伏乾歸; died 412), prince
Qifu Chipan (Chinese: 乞伏熾磐; died 428), prince
Qifu Mumo (Chinese: 乞伏暮末; died 431), last prince